Ivan Tsarevich and the Gray Wolf also commonly known as Prince Ivan and the Grey Wolf is a 2011 Russian animated film directed by Vladimir Toropchin.

Plot
The young princess Vasilisa from a faraway kingdom is too enthusiastic about her education and she dreams of marrying out of love only. Her father, an elderly king, not unfamiliar with intrigues, gives up in trying to get his daughter to "settle down". Meanwhile, his minister, cunning and dexterous, but not very intelligent, under the influence of a living shadow-spirit with sin in half decides to steal the famous royal key from the secret storage. In the opinion of this spirit, the best way to realize this plan is to marry Vasilisa. However, before the minister manages to convince the king in what he wants, the king announces to his daughter that she must marry the first man she meets. And this man turns out to be a certain Ivan from the neighboring kingdom - a simple guy, hard-working and good-natured, who dreams of becoming a fireman. By chance, the "unwilling bride and groom" fall in love with each other. But in order to defend their right to happiness, they have to endure many trials.

Cast
 Artur Smolyaninov - Gray Wolf
 Nikita Yefremov - Ivan Tsarevich
 Mikhail Boyarsky - Scholar Cat
 Tatiana Bunina - Vasilisa
 Ivan Okhlobystin - The King
 Viktor Sukhorukov - First Minister
 Aleksandr Boyarsky - The Spirit (Shadow)
 Elena Shulman - Mermaid, a woman with buckets, a woman in a fire
 Kristina Asmus - Squirrel
 Liya Akhedzhakova - Baba Yaga
 Sergey Russkin - Koschei
 Sergei Garmash - Serpent Gorynych
 Oleg Kulikovich - Magic ball, foreman, heroes
 Konstantin Bronzit - The Emperor
 Anatoly Petrov - Cook, townsperson

References

External links
 
 Official website

Melnitsa Animation Studio animated films
Russian animated fantasy films
2011 animated films
2011 films
Russian animated feature films
Animated adventure films
Animated comedy films
2010s fantasy comedy films
2010s adventure comedy films
Films about wolves
Animated films based on Slavic mythology
Films based on fairy tales
2011 comedy films
2010s children's animated films